Tops Pizza is a British pizza takeaway chain, with forty two stores in London and the South East of the United Kingdom. The company opened its first store at 74 Fulham Palace Road in 1988, by British–Iranian Ali Morad Yazdi Nodoushani, then aged 28, and who had been a civil engineering student. It is a private limited company.

In June 2009, the leaders of an Afghan criminal gang received long prison sentences for smuggling 230 Afghans into Europe, many to work in "branches of well known franchises Tops Pizza, GoGo Pizza and Perfect Pizza across southern England". In March 2014, staff were caught on CCTV climbing through the window of a closed Tops Pizza branch in Tunbridge Wells, after they forgot their keys.

References

External links 

1988 establishments in England
Pizza chains of the United Kingdom
Restaurants established in 1988
Fast-food franchises